Promo Disk 2000 (also known as Jitters) is the debut EP by Belarusian rock band Jitters, released in 2000. Both songs were written in English.

Critical reception
While reviewing the album, О’К, columnist music periodical Muzykalnaya Gazeta, wrote: "All over the flatness, this is free music, the music of new-new romantics who have been down with Britpop and are looking for something else based on it, therefore there is no such usual guitar rhythm, the instrument even sometimes goes backwards, but everything is also full of guitars and absently melodious".

Track listing
 "Floating Light"
 "Consumed"

Personnel
 Konstantin Karman – lead vocals, bass
 Syargey Kondratenka – guitar
 Eugene Vial – drums

References

2000 debut EPs
Jitters (band) albums
Rock EPs
EPs by Belarusian artists